Abba-esque is an extended play (EP) by British synth-pop duo Erasure. Released on 1 June 1992, the EP was Erasure's first and only number one on the UK Singles Chart and also became a number-one hit in Austria, Denmark, Finland, Greece, Ireland, and Sweden.

As big fans of the Swedish group ABBA, Erasure (Vince Clarke and Andy Bell) had often performed ABBA songs in concert over the years. They had originally planned to release an album of ABBA covers but instead opted to release an EP of four of ABBA's best known hits.

Background
Mute Records released Abba-esque in the UK, while Elektra Records released it in the US. Music videos were produced for all four tracks, and issued as a video EP on VHS. A remix EP was also released by Mute Records in the UK which featured the same four songs in heavily reworked form. Shortly after the release, ABBA's Gold: Greatest Hits album was released, sparking a revival of ABBA's music that has endured well into the 21st century.

After peaking at number two twice (with "Sometimes" in 1986 and Crackers International in 1988), Erasure finally reached number one in the UK with this release, remaining there for five weeks. In the United States, where EPs chart on the Billboard 200, Abba-esque peaked at number 85. Although never officially released as a single by itself, the song "Take a Chance on Me", which features a guest rap by MC Kinky, received significant radio play in the US, allowing it to peak at number 52 on the Billboard Hot 100 Airplay chart. In Sweden, the EP peaked at number one, staying there for six consecutive weeks, and it also peaked atop the charts of Austria, Denmark, Finland, Greece and Ireland.

The release of the Abba-esque EP in due course precipitated the release of a similar EP, Erasure-ish, by the ABBA tribute band Björn Again, which features two Erasure tracks ("A Little Respect" and "Stop!") performed in the style of ABBA as an answer record.

Critical reception
Joe Brown from The Washington Post wrote, "To promote its summer tour, reportedly a camp extravaganza surpassing the last one, electroduo Erasure offer a sweet, cool pop-sicle - a four-song EP of faithful ABBA covers, delivered without perceptible irony. Like George Michael, who sang a slew of beloved '70s songs on his most recent tour, Andy Bell gets to pretend he is ABBA - specifically Frida and Agnetha. You can imagine Bell singing "S.O.S." and "Lay All Your Love On Me" in front of his bedroom mirror (complete with faintly phonetic English), while synthmeister Vince Clark handles the Bjorn-and-Benny parts singlehandedly - dense, bleeping-and-whooshing synth textures that sound like Giorgio Moroder's late-'70s settings for Donna Summer. Erasure drags yet another guilty pop pleasure out of the closet - what's surprising now is how grown-up and complex these ABBA songs really were beneath their candy coatings."

Music videos
The music video for "Take a Chance on Me" was directed by Philippe Gautier, and the other three were directed by Jan Kounen.

Track listings
Abba-esque
 "Lay All Your Love on Me" (B. Andersson / B. Ulvaeus) – 4:45
 "SOS" (S. Anderson / B. Andersson/B. Ulvaeus) – 3:49
 "Take a Chance on Me" (B. Andersson / B. Ulvaeus) – 3:43
 "Voulez-Vous" (B. Andersson / B. Ulvaeus) – 5:35

Abba-esque – The Remixes
 "Voulez-Vous" (Brain Stem Death Test Mix) (remixed by Fortran 5)
 "Lay All Your Love on Me" (No Panties Mix) (remixed by Fortran 5)
 "Take a Chance on Me" (Take a Trance on Me Mix) (remixed by Philip Kelsey)
 "SOS" (Perimeter Mix) (remixed by Chris & Cosey)

Charts

Weekly charts

Year-end charts

Decade-end charts

Certifications

References

1992 EPs
ABBA tribute albums
Covers EPs
Erasure albums
Irish Singles Chart number-one singles
Mute Records EPs
Number-one singles in Austria
Number-one singles in Denmark
Number-one singles in Finland
Number-one singles in Greece
Number-one singles in Sweden
UK Singles Chart number-one singles